Château de la Fontaine  is a château in Anse, Rhône, France. It was built in the 16th century.

Notes

Houses completed in the 16th century
Châteaux in Rhône (department)